Surge (Noriko Ashida) is a superhero appearing in American comic books published by Marvel Comics. The character is depicted as a mutant, a member of the student body in the Xavier Institute, and a member of the former New Mutants squad therein. She maintained her powers post M-Day and was the leader of the New X-Men.

Publication history

Surge was created by Nunzio DeFilippis, Christina Weir, Keron Grant and first appeared in New Mutants, vol. 2 #8 (January 2004).

Fictional character biography
Noriko Ashida was born in Japan. She was close to her brother, Keitaro, but she ran away from home after her powers manifested when she was thirteen years old; she claimed that her father "doesn't believe in mutants." How she came to the United States is unknown, but she ended up homeless on the streets of Salem Center, reduced to buying illegal drugs using stolen money.

With no training or practice in the use of her powers, Noriko's body automatically absorbs all nearby electricity and, once fully charged, releases it in a storm of electrical bolts. In addition, her acceleration ability forces her to speak so quickly that no one can understand her. Though she finds no treatment for most of these problems, the drugs sedate her body enough that she can control her outbursts of electrical power. Keeping herself regularly supplied proves impossible, however, and during a robbery Noriko accidentally hits the young owner of a coffee shop with an electric bolt. A group of young mutants finds her and brings her back to the X-Mansion. There, Beast designs gauntlets that regulate her absorption of ambient electricity and discharge as required to prevent further mental overloads.

Nori becomes a student of the Xavier Institute and, when the school adopts a squad system, is assigned to the New Mutants squad led by Danielle Moonstar. She is forced to share a room with Dust; the two young women disagree upon the role of women and the Muslim traditions that Dust follows. Though initially hostile to the mutants who took her off the street - David Alleyne, Josh Foley, Sofia Mantega, and Laurie Collins - she soon comes to accept them as her friends.

David asks Emma Frost to remove a mental block in his mind inhibiting him from recalling all the information and skills he has acquired. David sees a possible future in which he becomes the world's foremost genius, marries Noriko, and leads to her death. Disturbed, David begins to avoid her. Annoyed at such treatment, Nori ultimately confronts David, which leads to the two becoming an active couple.

Noriko retains her powers after the events of House of M.  With only 27 students retaining their powers, Emma Frost orders the depowered students and staff, including Nori's advisor Danielle Moonstar, to leave the institute. As it departs, one bus of depowered students is bombed by anti-mutant zealot Reverend William Stryker, killing all on board. Though depowered, David is not killed, and he and Nori further their romantic relationship. Most of the remaining students are organized into a melee fight to determine who would become a member of Emma Frost's X-Men-in-training. Nori is chosen by Frost to be the team's leader. Soon afterwards, Nori receives new, lighter, and more effective gauntlets from Forge.

Caught in an argument over the rescue of Cessily, Surge and Hellion are the only students that are not teleported to Limbo. Trance uses her powers to get a message to the two, informing them that the Institute students had been taken into Limbo by Belasco, and that Belasco killed David. Coordinating with O*N*E*, Surge and Hellion discover that Amanda Sefton has been expelled from Limbo and is in a coma in Germany. Surge becomes impulsive and angry at David's death, threatening the O*N*E* troopers when they attempt to block her from seeing Sefton, using her electrical powers to revive the sorceress despite the risks. At the behest of Lexington, Megaton's pilot, Surge and Hellion stop fighting demons and head for the castle. Surge leads the united Xavier Institute students against the demonic hordes, engaging the twisted sorcerer in single combat before Belasco is killed by Pixie and Darkchild. The institute is returned to Earth, at Santo's insistence.

After their return from Limbo, Surge finds out from X-23 the torture David went through in Limbo. In hopes of driving him away from the school and out of harm's way, Surge kisses Hellion in front of David and the other students. After confronting her of the incident, she insists that she doesn't love him anymore and pleads that he should leave the institute. This backfires, as David regains his memories of the knowledge he once had and copied up until he lost his power with the help of the Stepford Cuckoos. David decides to both stay at the Institute and end their relationship.

Following the dissolution of the X-Men, Surge runs to Colorado, seeking help from Dani Moonstar. Nori is overwhelmed by the pain she has endured as a New X-Man and doesn't know how to cope. Nori realizes that her fear of being hurt has affected her judgment and driven her actions over the past months. She later officially joins the X-Men based out of San Francisco: she is seen working on one of the street crime patrols.

Surge is later kidnapped along with Boom Boom and Hellion by the Leper Queen and her Sapien League. The Leper Queen injects her with a modified version of the Legacy Virus. X-Force rescues their friends after completing their mission. Elixir is able to cure Surge before she could destroy the UN.

We next see Surge defending the Golden Gate bridge during the 'Second Coming' event in which Bastion assaults the X-Men, who is in search of the 'Mutant Messiah' Hope Summers. Once again Nori is devastated when yet another teammate is injured during the initial Nimrod attack, destroying the hands of Hellion. Plunged into the waters of San Francisco Bay by Bastions last ditch attack, Nori witnesses Hope Summers emerge as the Mutant Messiah.

Powers and abilities
Surge absorbs electricity at all times: from static in the air, electrical appliances, outlets, etc. (often causing lights to flicker, etc.).  She can't control the absorption, and thus must wear specially designed gauntlets at all times to regulate it.  She can discharge the energy through powerful lightning-like blasts or channel it into bursts of superhuman speed. If she takes in too much energy, it causes mental overloads which cause her to speak too fast, scatters her thinking, and worsens her control over the blasts.

Her blue hair is not related to her mutation. According to Nori, it came in a bottle labeled "electric blue" (and, indeed, she debuted with black hair).

Personality
Very forthright and strong-minded, Nori has often clashed with her peers and superiors, from nearly getting into a brawl with Hellion after he insulted Prodigy's baseline status post-M-Day, and challenging Cyclops' assertion that the students are safe at the institute (this taking place immediately after a series of devastating attacks by the Purifiers).  Nori also considers herself a feminist, attacking Dust's choice of garb as a betrayal of women's rights when the two are roomed together.

Regardless, Nori is a loyal figure, dedicated to her friends, and increasingly feeling the responsibilities placed upon her as leader of the New X-Men. Surge was particularly incensed with Hellion's decision to rescue Mercury from the Faculty without backup, and has taken it upon herself to mold the team into an effective unit capable of defending the rest of the students. She's seen as having trouble welcoming X-23 back to the team after the latter's involvement in X-Force, possibly due to how the latter seemingly doesn't have to take responsibility for what she did as part of that team, in comparison to her own mounting responsibilities. Chris Yost has stated that, "Surge is the right candidate, because she wants it the least. And you'll see, it's taking a big toll on her. Being a leader when you're doing team sports and field day exercises is one thing, but leading when the stakes are life and death is another thing."

Other versions

House of M
Nori is a member of Hellions in the House of M reality which is a group of junior agents of S.H.I.E.L.D. Her father is a human terrorist whom she was taken away from at a young age.  She was taken off the squad and replaced with Magik due to her father's involvement in their latest mission.  She then recruits help from some of the students from the New Mutant Leadership Institute and they travel to Japan where they come across Project Genesis.

In other media
 Surge appears in Marvel Disk Wars: The Avengers, voiced by Kokoro Kikuchi in the Japanese version and Stephanie Sheh in the English version. This version's hair is naturally blue. After briefly becoming romantically attracted to Hikaru Akatsuki, she leaves for the Xavier Institute with Wolverine to receive protection from Magneto.
 Surge appears in X-Men: Destiny, voiced by Aileen Ong Casas.

References

External links
 Surge at Marvel.com
 Surge at Marvel Wiki

Comics characters introduced in 2004
Fictional characters with electric or magnetic abilities
Marvel Comics characters who can move at superhuman speeds
Marvel Comics female superheroes
Marvel Comics mutants
New Mutants
Japanese-American superheroes
Characters created by Nunzio DeFilippis
Characters created by Christina Weir